Lagerstroemia, commonly known as crape myrtle (also spelled crepe myrtle or crêpe myrtle), is a genus of around 50 species of deciduous and evergreen trees and shrubs native to the Indian subcontinent, southeast Asia, northern Australia, and other parts of Oceania, cultivated in warmer climates around the world. It is a member of the family Lythraceae, which is also known as the loosestrife family. The genus is named after Swedish merchant Magnus von Lagerström, a director of the Swedish East India Company, who supplied Carl Linnaeus with plants he collected. These flowering trees are beautifully colored and are often planted both privately and commercially as ornamentals.

Description

Crape myrtles are chiefly known for their colorful and long-lasting flowers, which occur in summer. Most species of Lagerstroemia have sinewy, fluted stems and branches with a mottled appearance that arises from having bark that sheds throughout the year. The leaves of temperate species provide autumn color.

Flowers are borne in summer and autumn in panicles of crinkled flowers with a crêpe-like texture. Colors vary from deep purple to red to white, with almost every shade in between. Although no blue-flowered varieties exist, the flowers trend toward the blue end of the spectrum with no orange or yellow except in stamens and pistils. The fruit is a capsule, green and succulent at first, then ripening to dark brown or black dryness. It splits along six or seven lines, producing teeth much like those of the calyx, and releases numerous, small, winged seeds.

In their respective climates, both subtropical and tropical species are common in domestic and commercial landscapes. The timber of some species has been used to manufacture bridges, furniture, and railway sleepers, but in Vietnam's Cát Tiên National Park, the dominant stands of Lagerstroemia calyculata in secondary forest are thought to have survived (after episodes of logging) due to the low quality of wood. Lagerstroemia species are used as food plants by the larvae of some Lepidoptera (moth and butterfly) species, including Endoclita malabaricus.

The leaves of L. parviflora are fed on by the Antheraea paphia moth, which produces the tassar silk, a form of wild silk of commercial importance in India.

Landscaping and gardening 
Certain species of crape myrtle are used in landscaping and gardening as screens, lawn specimens, shrub borders, and container plants. Since crape myrtles are found in many places, opinions differ as to how to cultivate them in landscaping.  Crape myrtles are  best cultivated in warmer southern climates, US zones 7–9, and prefer full sun.  They occur in a variety of flowering colors and size. 

Crape myrtles might have been considered messy in the past, but their seedpods cannot stain concrete, so are best planted near swimming pools, decks, and sidewalks.

Selected species

 Lagerstroemia anhuiensis
 Lagerstroemia anisontera
 Lagerstroemia anisoptera
 Lagerstroemia balansae
 Lagerstroemia calyculata
 Lagerstroemia caudata
 Lagerstroemia cristata
 Lagerstroemia excelsa
 Lagerstroemia fauriei
 Lagerstroemia floribunda
 Lagerstroemia fordii
 Lagerstroemia glabra
 Lagerstroemia guilinensis
 Lagerstroemia indica
 Lagerstroemia intermedia
 Lagerstroemia langkawiensis
 Lagerstroemia limii
 Lagerstroemia loudonii
 Lagerstroemia micrantha
 Lagerstroemia microcarpa
 Lagerstroemia minuticarpa
 Lagerstroemia "Natchez"
 Lagerstroemia ovalifolia
 Lagerstroemia paniculata
 Lagerstroemia parviflora
 Lagerstroemia siamica
 Lagerstroemia speciosa
 Lagerstroemia stenopetala
 Lagerstroemia subcostata
 Lagerstroemia subsessilifolia
 Lagerstroemia suprareticulata
 Lagerstroemia tomentosa
 Lagerstroemia turbinata Koehne
 Lagerstroemia venusta
 Lagerstroemia villosa

The common crape myrtle (L. indica) from China and Korea was introduced circa 1790 to Charleston, South Carolina, in the United States, by French botanist André Michaux. In the wild, the species is most often found as a multiple-stemmed, large shrub, but 200 years of cultivation have resulted in a huge number of cultivars of widely varying characteristics. In Europe, crape myrtle is common in the south of France, the Iberian Peninsula, and most of Italy; in the United States, it is an iconic plant of gardens across the Southern United States from Maryland to Central Texas. It has been cultivated in many parts of Australia, but is most common in the areas of the country with a Mediterranean climate such as the south-east and west.

While not as widely known, the Japanese crape myrtle, L. fauriei, from central and southern Japan, is becoming increasingly important, both as a landscaping plant and as a parent in complex hybrids with L. indica. This species is distinctly tree-like, with colorful, deciduous bark and dark green leaves, which are more resistant to fungal diseases than are those of its more popular relative. Flowers are as large as those of L. indica, but are white with only the slightest pink flush appearing in some individuals. Japanese crape myrtle is hardier to cold than many strains of L. indica, a characteristic (along with fungal resistance, tree form, and colorful bark) that makes it valuable as genetic material for hybridization. Cultivars available include 'Kiowa', 'Fantasy', and 'Townhouse'.

L. speciosa, known as queen crape myrtle, giant crape myrtle, or banabá, originates in subtropical and tropical India. It can be grown in any similar climate, but in the United States is suitable only for Florida, southernmost Texas, South Louisiana, coastal southern California, and Hawaii. It is a large evergreen tree with colorful rosy-mauve flowers and striking white bark, suitable for public parks and avenues; only the seed-grown species is commonly available for sale, unlike L. indica and L. fauriei, which have dozens of cultivars.

References

Further reading
 
 Flora, The Gardeners' Bible, ABC Publishing, Ultimo, NSW, Australia, 2006

External links

 

 
Lythraceae genera
Garden plants
Ornamental trees
Taxa named by Carl Linnaeus